The devinalh (roughly meaning "guesswork"), was a genre of Old Occitan lyric poetry practiced by some troubadours. It takes the form of a riddle, or series of riddles or cryptograms and is, if read literally, mostly nonsensical. Known practitioners include Guilhen de Peiteu, Raimbaut of Orange, Giraut de Bornelh, Guilhem Ademar, Guilhem de Berguedan and Raimbaut de Vaqueiras.

The term was created by modern scholars of Old Occitan and was never used by the troubadours themselves to refer to a specific type of poem.

Examples
This was a rare genre, of which only a handful of examples exist; among them:
 Farai un vers de dreit nien by Guilhen de Peiteu, the first known example
 Las frevols venson lo plus fort by Raimbaut de Vaqueiras
 Taflamart faflama hoflomom maflamal puflums siflima eflementre boflomonaflamas geflemens, a cryptogram by Cerveri de Girona

References
Kay, Sarah: Courtly Contradictions: The Emergence of the Literary Object in the Twelfth Century, Arthuriana,  Vol. 13 No. 3 (2003) pp. 118-120

External links

Western medieval lyric forms
Occitan literary genres